The 2019 Pittsburgh Panthers football team represented the University of Pittsburgh in the 2019 NCAA Division I FBS football season. The Panthers were led by fifth-year head coach Pat Narduzzi and played their home games at Heinz Field. They competed in the Coastal Division of the Atlantic Coast Conference (ACC). This was Pitt's seventh season as a member of the ACC.

Preseason

Preseason media poll
In the preseason ACC media poll, Pitt was predicted to finish in fourth in the Coastal Division.

Schedule
The Panthers schedule was released on January 16, 2019.

Game summaries

Virginia

Ohio

at Penn State

UCF

Delaware

at Duke

at Syracuse

Miami (FL)

at Georgia Tech

North Carolina

at Virginia Tech

Boston College

vs Eastern Michigan (Quick Lane Bowl)

Coaching staff

Roster

Source:

Team players drafted into the NFL

References

Pittsburgh
Pittsburgh Panthers football seasons
Pittsburgh Panthers football
Quick Lane Bowl champion seasons